Alwyn 'Junior' Bester (born 15 April 1987 in Vredendal) is a South African rugby union player, currently playing with the . His regular position is flanker or number 8.

Career

Youth

He came through the youth structures at Wellington-based side  and played for the  side in 2007 and 2008.

Boland Cavaliers

He graduated to the senior side in 2009, being named in the 2009 Vodacom Cup squad. He started all six of Boland's matches in that competition and was also included in their Currie Cup squad for the 2009 Currie Cup Premier Division competition.

Pumas

He made seven appearances in total for the Pumas, scoring one try.

Return to Boland Cavaliers

He remained with the Pumas for just one season before returning to former side . He remained a regular in the team during his three-year spell there, making close to fifty appearances in the Vodacom Cup and Currie Cup competitions.

SWD Eagles

He left Boland for the second time after the conclusion of the 2013 Currie Cup First Division season though, joining near-rivals  prior to the 2014 season.

References

1987 births
Living people
People from Matzikama Local Municipality
White South African people
South African rugby union players
Boland Cavaliers players
Pumas (Currie Cup) players
SWD Eagles players
Rugby union flankers
Rugby union players from the Western Cape